This is a list of notable Arab Chilean individuals born in Chile or people of Lebanese and Chilean dual nationality who live or lived in Chile.

Athletes
Alexis Khazzaka - football (soccer) player
Nicolás Massú - tennis player

Politicians
Karen Atala - attorney and judge

See also
Arab Chileans
List of Lebanese people
List of Lebanese people (Diaspora)

References

Chile
Lebanese
Lebanese